MacCabe Corner is the name given to the south-west corner of the state of New South Wales, Australia. MacCabe Corner is named for Francis MacCabe, a surveyor who did considerable work exploring and mapping New South Wales, in particular the rivers of the Murray-Darling basin.

Location 
MacCabe Corner has been described as the point at which the borders of the state of South Australia, Victoria and New South Wales meet. However the Geographical Names Board of New South Wales places MacCabe Corner at "The junction of the prolongation of the South Australia - New South Wales State border with the southern high bank of the Murray River being the New South Wales - Victoria State border." The boundary between Victoria and South Australia is the mid-line of the river. Thus the precise location of MacCabe Corner is at the south-west corner of New South Wales, approximately 100 metres from the place where the three state borders meet in the waters of the Murray River.

The boundary between New South Wales and Victoria is the top of the left bank (Victorian side) of the Murray River. Although the eastern border of South Australia is notionally the line of 141 degrees east longitude, the borders with the states of New South Wales and Victoria do not line up across the Murray River. The three state borders meet in the waters of the Murray River approximately 100 metres north of MacCabe Corner as the New South Wales border with Victoria is the top of the left bank of the river, but the South Australia border with Victoria is mid-stream.

See also 

 South Australia–Victoria border dispute

References

Borders of South Australia
Borders of Victoria (Australia)
Borders of New South Wales